Joseph Nicholas DePietro (June 10, 1914 – March 19, 1999) was an American bantamweight (56 kg) weightlifter. He won gold medals at the 1947 World Championships, 1948 Summer Olympics and 1951 Pan American Games. During his career DePietro set two world records, in 1947 and 1948, both in the press. DePietro had very short arms and body, so that the bar was barely clearing his head when he was lifting it.

References

1914 births
1999 deaths
Sportspeople from Paterson, New Jersey
American male weightlifters
Weightlifters at the 1948 Summer Olympics
Olympic gold medalists for the United States in weightlifting
Olympic medalists in weightlifting
Medalists at the 1948 Summer Olympics
Pan American Games gold medalists for the United States
Pan American Games medalists in weightlifting
Weightlifters at the 1951 Pan American Games
World Weightlifting Championships medalists
Medalists at the 1951 Pan American Games